Stora Tuna OK is a Swedish orienteering club in Borlänge. It was the orienteering section of Stora Tuna IK until 2009.

Tove Alexandersson, Julia Jakob, Annichen Kringstad, and Emil Svensk are orienteers that have run for Stora Tuna OK.

Merits 
 Winner Tiomila (Tiomila relay): 1964
 Winner Tiomila (women's relay): 1982, 1984, 2008, 2017 
 Winner Tiomila (youth relay): 2006, 2007, 2016
 Winner Jukola relay: 2019 
 Winner Venla relay: 1982, 1984, 1995, 2018
 Winner 25-manna: 1983, 1991, 2010
 Swedish Championship, relay: 2018

Relays

Tiomila 
Rune Sund, Anders Thunström, Göran Berglund, Seppo Simonen, Bertil Jansson, Hans Nordström, Lars Arvidsson, Jan Limell, Håkan Rystedt and Kenneth Hindsberg won the Tiomila relay in 1964.

Anne Bössfall, Karin Gunnarsson, Gunilla Lundström, Ylva Grape, Annichen Kringstad won the women's relay in Tiomila in 1982. Nearly the same team (with Ingrid Lentz instead of Gunilla Lundström) won again in 1984.

Lena Gillgren, Anna Mårsell, Juliette Soulard, Emma Engstrand, and Lena Eliasson won in 2008. In 2017 the winning team consisted of Anna Mårsell, Magdalena Olsson, Julia Gross, Frida Sandberg and Tove Alexandersson.

Venla 2018 
Tove Alexandersson, Julia Jakob,  and Magdalena Olsson won the Venla relay in 2018.

Jukola 2019

References 

2008 establishments in Sweden
Orienteering clubs in Sweden
Sports clubs established in 2008
Sport in Borlänge